The Frog Hollow Stone Mill, or just the Stone Mill, is a historic industrial building at 3 Mill Street in Middlebury, Vermont.  Built in 1840, it is an important local reminder of the town's industrial past, and was listed on the National Register of Historic Places in 1973.  It presently houses a restaurant, a public market, a co-working space and four lodging units.

Description and history
The former Frog Hollow Stone Mill stands on the south bank of Otter Creek, at a point where the normally north-flowing river bends to the west.  The mill is located a short way west of downtown Middlebury.  The building is four stories in height, and is built out of locally quarried stone laid in irregular courses.  It is covered by a gabled roof.  The main facade, facing south toward Mill Street, is symmetrical, with recessed loading bay entrances at the center of each level, flanked on each side by sash windows.  A loading boom projects above the top level in the gable.  The interior of the building, including some of its internal structural elements, reflect alterations due primarily to a history of fires with which it was plagued.

Industrial use of the mill site began early in Middlebury's history, with a grist mill built there in 1789.  In 1812, the mill was converted to cotton textile production, and in 1835 the Middlebury Manufacturing Company was founded.  The present building was erected in 1840, and underwent a number of ownership changes, fires, and other alterations into the 20th century.  It was acquired by the town in the early 1970s, and is now a student art space for Middlebury College.

See also
National Register of Historic Places listings in Addison County, Vermont

References

External links 
Stone Mill website https://www.stonemillvt.com/
 Middlebury College page

National Register of Historic Places in Addison County, Vermont
Buildings and structures completed in 1840
Buildings and structures in Middlebury, Vermont
Industrial buildings and structures on the National Register of Historic Places in Vermont
Historic district contributing properties in Vermont
Cotton mills in the United States
Middlebury College